Cimolopterygidae is an extinct family of ornithurines known from the Late Cretaceous epoch. Remains attributed to cimolopterygids have been found in the Frenchman Formation of Saskatchewan, the Lance Formation of Wyoming, the Fox Hills Formation of Colorado, the Hell Creek Formation of Montana, and the Allen Formation of Rio Negro, Argentina. Most date to the end of the Maastrichtian age, about  million years ago, though a much earlier species has also been identified from the Campanian-aged Dinosaur Park Formation of Alberta, about 75 million years ago.

References

Controversial bird taxa
Late Cretaceous birds of Asia
Late Cretaceous birds of North America
Late Cretaceous first appearances
Late Cretaceous extinctions
Prehistoric ornithurans
Prehistoric dinosaur families